"Outlaw" is a song by American hip-hop artist 50 Cent. The song features production from hip-hop producer Cardiak, and was officially released as a digital download on July 19, 2011.

Background
The song was released after 50 Cent revealed on Twitter that he and his label were having creative differences and that his album would be on hold until both parties agreed. 50 Cent took matters into his own hands and released the song himself on his website Thisis50.com on June 16. Due to the quick success of the song, 50 Cent said on Twitter that the labels had agreed and that the song's success encouraged them to push the album.

Chart performance
The song charted on the US Hot R&B/Hip-Hop Songs chart at number ninety-nine on the week ending July 23, 2011 on urban contemporary radio airplay only, prior to its digital release. It debuted on the Billboard Hot 100 at number 87 on the week ending August 6, 2011, after its first full week of digital sales.

Track listing
Digital Single

Release information

Purchaseable release

Chart positions

References

2011 songs
2011 singles
50 Cent songs
Songs written by 50 Cent
Songs written by Cardiak
Shady Records singles
Aftermath Entertainment singles
Interscope Records singles